Main Street Historic District is a national historic district located at Brockport in Monroe County, New York. The district encompasses 51 contributing structures and one contributing structure, a canal lift bridge.  All buildings in the district are commercial, except the U.S. Post Office and a church.

It was listed on the National Register of Historic Places in 2004.

Gallery

References

Brockport, New York
Historic districts on the National Register of Historic Places in New York (state)
Historic districts in Monroe County, New York
National Register of Historic Places in Monroe County, New York